Naval Auxiliary Landing Field Orange Grove or NALF Orange Grove  is a military airport located southwest of Orange Grove, a city in Jim Wells County, Texas, United States. Owned by the United States Navy, it supports pilot training for NAS Kingsville. It has two runways, 1/19 and 13/31, each measuring 8,000 x 200 ft (2,438 x 61 m).

Although most U.S. airports use the same three-letter location identifier for the FAA and IATA, NALF Orange Grove is assigned NOG by the FAA but has no designation from the IATA (which assigned NOG to Nogales International Airport in Nogales, Sonora, Mexico

References

External links 
 Naval Auxiliary Landing Field (NALF) Orange Grove at GlobalSecurity.org
 

Airports in Texas
Buildings and structures in Jim Wells County, Texas
Orange Grove